The Marcos family is a political family in the Philippines. They have established themselves in the country's politics, having established a political dynasty that traces its beginnings to the 1925 election of Mariano Marcos to the Philippine House of Representatives as congressman for the second district of Ilocos Norte; reached its peak during the 21-year rule of Ferdinand Marcos as president of the Philippines that included his 14-year dictatorship beginning with the declaration of Martial Law throughout the country; and continues today with the political careers of Imelda Marcos, Imee Marcos, Sandro Marcos and reached its peak again with the presidency of Ferdinand Marcos Jr.

Imee Marcos has attributed the continued reign of the Marcos family to the inherent feudalism of Philippine culture. Although nominally democratic, Philippine society effectively blocks individual Philippine citizens from having much political power, forcing them to be dependent on powerful figures that social scientists have called "bosses" or "caciques". Sandro Marcos, the most politically prominent of the fourth generation of Marcoses, has argued that political dynasties are simply a "natural progression" for members of powerful families.

Although Article II Section 26 of the current Philippine constitution, promulgated after the Marcoses were ousted from the Philippines in 1986, explicitly prohibits the perpetuation of political dynasties, little legislation has since been put in place to enforce the provision. The prominence of the Marcos family in Philippine politics has been stopped twice. The first came with the victory of Julio Nalundasan over Mariano Marcos and the subsequent arrest of Ferdinand Marcos for his murder, the publicity for which brought Ferdinand Marcos to the national consciousness and eventually led to his rise to power. The second was when "Ferdinand Marcos’s dictatorship' was deposed by the 1986 EDSA People Power Revolution and the Marcos family was exiled to Hawaii. After Ferdinand Marcos's 1989 death, the remaining members of the family were allowed to return to the Philippines to face various corruption charges in 1992. However, they were able to return to political power that same year, to the dismay of many Filipino people, with the election of Bongbong Marcos as congressman for the second district of Ilocos Norte.

At least one other branch of the family, that of Ferdinand Sr.'s sister Elizabeth Marcos-Keon, is also in politics, with her son Michael Marcos Keon having been elected board member in 2004 and governor of Ilocos Norte in 2007.

Despite his father's reputation, Bongbong Marcos won 2022 Philippine presidential election and was sworn on June 30, 2022.

History

Beginnings of the Marcos dynasty (1925–1945)

The Second Congressional District of Ilocos Norte 
The Marcos political dynasty is generally acknowledged to have been founded when Mariano Marcos y Rubio (1897–1945) was elected to the Philippine House of Representatives as congressman for the second district of Ilocos Norte in 1925, although his father Fabian Marcos also served in local politics, as Gobernadorcillo (the equivalent of today's Mayor) of Batac in the days after the Philippine Revolution.

Mariano Marcos became a prominent member of the house, serving as chairman of the house committee on ways and means, and as member of the committees on public instruction, public works, public estate, and mines and natural resources. In the election of 1932, however, he ran against Emilio Medina of Laoag and Julio Nalundasan of Batac. With the Batac vote split between him and Nalundasan, Medina won the house seat.

The murder of Julio Nalundasan 
Mariano Marcos fought a highly contested election against Nalundasan for the same seat in 1935, and Nalundasan won by a landslide. A day after his proclamation, Nalundasan mocked Marcos publicly, organizing a mock funeral parade that ended in front of the Marcos house to show that Mariano's political career was "dead".

On that same night, Nalundasan was shot dead by a sniper when he stepped out onto his back porch to brush his teeth. Mariano Marcos, his brother Pio, his son Ferdinand, and his brother-in-law Quirino Lizardo all became suspects. Mariano and Pio were cleared of the crime, but Ferdinand Marcos and Quirino Lizardo were arrested.

Aware of the publicity he could get out of the national coverage of the trial, Ferdinand represented himself before the court, with the lawyers hired by the family for the trial guiding him in his legal arguments.

Ferdinand initially lost the case and he and Lizardo were convicted. Public interest in the case, however, led to the Supreme Court of the Philippines eventually overthrowing the conviction, with Associate Justice José P. Laurel arguing that it would have been a waste for someone with Ferdinand's legal talents to merely rot in a prison cell.

The trial, and the overturning of the conviction turned Ferdinand Marcos into the "most famous young man in the islands", with then-President Manuel L. Quezon arranging to meet the boy and suggesting that he use the newfound popularity to enter Philippine politics.

Before that could happen, however, the Marcoses were overtaken by the events of World War II.

The execution of Mariano Marcos 
Mariano Marcos was executed in the closing days of the war, on March 8, 1945. The Marcos family's account claims that he was executed by the Japanese, but other eyewitness accounts say that he was caught by Philippine guerillas, tried as a Japanese collaborator, and executed through dismemberment using two carabaos.

Ferdinand Marcos and the rise of the Marcos dynasty (1949–1986)

The rise of Ferdinand Marcos 
Because the Nalundasan murder trial resulting drew wide public attention in the years immediately prior to the war, Mariano's son Ferdinand was in an ideal political position to enter politics in the postwar years. Ferdinand Marcos's rise to power was dramatic. He served three terms in Mariano's own former position as the Philippine House of Representatives as the Congressman for the second district of Ilocos Norte, from 1949 to 1959. Between 1959 and 1965, he served in the Philippine Senate, where he became Senate President until he won the Philippine Presidential Election of 1965 to become the tenth president of the Philippines, staying in the position for 21 years despite the eight year (two four year terms) limitation set by the 1935 Constitution of the Philippines by placing the country under Martial Law in 1972.

Ferdinand Marcos's political prominence would pave the way for other members of the Marcos family to be appointed or elected to various national elections - what would eventually become known as the Marcos dynasty.

Dovie Beams and the expansion of the Conjugal Dictatorship 
Some time in 1968, Ferdinand Marcos began an affair with Nashville actress Dovie Beams. When Marcos got tired of the dalliance in early 1970 and broke up with Beams, the actress released sex tapes of herself and President Marcos. Author Seagrave recounts that: Student protesters at the University of the Philippines commandeered the campus radio station and broadcast a looped tape; soon the entire nation was listening in astonishment to President Marcos begging Dovie Beams to perform oral sex. For over a week the President's hoarse injunctions boomed out over university loudspeakers. Historians note that Ferdinand Marcos's president's wife Imelda Marcos reacted to the humiliation by aggressively pursuing government positions. This was later confirmed by Economic Planning Minister Gerardo Sicat in his biography of Prime Minister Cesar Virata, where he recounted that the creation of the Metro Manila Commission and the appointment of Imelda Marcos as its head in the position of Governor of Metro Manila was a direct result of Marcos attempting to placate his wife's tantrums after the Dovie Beams affair.

Imelda Marcos held the position until the Marcos family was deposed in 1986, and would later be concurrently appointed to the Marcos cabinet as Minister of Human Settlements from 1978 to 1986. In addition, she was elected as Assemblyman for Region IV-A to the Batasan Pambansa from 1978 to 1984.

The other Marcoses 
Ferdinand's sister Elizabeth Marcos-Keon became Governor of Ilocos Norte from 1971 to 1983. The Marcos couple's firstborn, Imee Marcos, was appointed chairman of the Kabataang Barangay from 1975 to 1986, and was assemblyman to the Batasang Pambansa for Ilocos Norte from 1984 to 1986. Secondborn Bongbong Marcos become vice governor of Ilocos Norte from 1980 to 1983 and governor of that same province from 1983 to 1986.

Ferdinand Marcos was known for favoring family members with business concessions. He gave relatives government-related jobs, often putting them in charge of agencies or government-owned corporations with cash incomes.

Fortuna Marcos Barba and her husband Marcelino Barba are said to have made a fortune from government logging concessions given to her by Ferdinand Marcos. Fortuna owned four undeveloped lots in the fashionable April Sound subdivision on Lake Conroe in the United States. The lots were suspected of being purchased with money stolen from the Philippine treasury. Fortuna Barba was the last surviving sister of Ferdinand Marcos until her death in March 2018.

Only his brother Pacifico Marcos remains alive. He was placed in charge of Medicare, which collects compulsory insurance contributions from Philippine workers. By 1979, he also controlled at least 14 private corporations involved in mining, coconut refining, and management consulting.

The People Power Revolution, and the exile of the Marcoses (1986–1991)

As a result of the economic collapse brought about by the assassination of Ninoy Aquino in 1983, the Marcos family was removed from power by civilian protests during the 1986 People Power Revolution.

Fearful of a scenario in which Marcos's presence in the Philippines would lead to a civil war, the Reagan administration withdrew its support for the Marcos government, and flew Marcos and a party of about 80 individuals—the extended Marcos family and a number of close associates—from the Philippines to Hawaii. All the Marcos children—Imee, Marcos Jr., Irene, and young Aimee—were on the flight.

The exiles stayed at Hickam Air Force Base at the expense of the US Government. A month later, the Marcoses moved into a pair of residences in Makiki Heights, Honolulu, which were registered to Marcos cronies Antonio Floirendo and Bienvenido and Gliceria Tantoco.

President Corazon Aquino eventually allowed the members of the Marcos family to return to the Philippines after the death of Ferdinand Marcos, supposedly so that they could face various corruption charges.

Return of the Marcoses (1991–present)

Political offices after returning to the Philippines 
Within a year of returning to the Philippines, Imelda Marcos was running for president in the 1992 Philippine presidential election, finishing 5th out of 7 candidates. In that same year Marcos Jr. ran in a much smaller local election rather than a national race, easily regaining the family's traditional post of Congressman for the Second District of Ilocos Norte. Since then, Imelda, Ferdinand Jr., and Imee Marcos have run for numerous posts, alternatingly winning posts including the house seat for the Second District of Ilocos Norte, the house seat for the Second District of Ilocos Norte, the governorship of Ilocos Norte. Ferdinand Jr. became a Senator from 2010 to 2016, and ran for the post of Vice President during the 2016 Philippine presidential election, but narrowly lost to Vice President Leni Robredo. Six years later, he ran for President in the 2022 elections and won by a landslide.

Marcos historical revisionism 

Historians, journalists, other observers of Philippine politics have noted that the political rehabilitation of the Marcoses has been made possible through "Marcos revisionism"—a systematic effort to revise the public's perception of the history of martial law and the Marcos administration.

Philippine government, civil society, and academic institutions such as the National Historical Commission of the Philippines, the University of the Philippines Diliman Department of History, the Ateneo de Manila University, the Center for Media Freedom and Responsibility, the Philippine Commission on Human Rights, and the Philippine government's Presidential Commission on Good Government say that the Marcos revisionist techniques or narratives perpetuated include:
 denial or downplaying of the tortures and murders that took place during martial law;
 the myth that the Marcos period was a "golden age" rather than a period of debt-driven growth and corruption-triggered collapse;
 the myth that all the victims of martial law were communists or communist sympathizers; and
 the myth that the children of Ferdinand Marcos, who reached the age of the majority a few years after the declaration of martial law—were too young to know about the abuses of the martial law era.

Some historiographers such as Filomeno Aguilar Jr. attribute the rise of Marcos revisionism to the lack of comprehensive, in-depth scholarly work on the history of the Marcos family and of Martial Law. While there is a significant body of scholarly literature on these subjects, it mostly takes the form of collections of papers, rather than comprehensive scholarly works.

Political positions held

Presidents and spouses

 Ferdinand Marcos: Member of the Philippine House of Representatives from Ilocos Norte's Second District (1949–1959); Member of the Philippine Senate (1959—1965); tenth president of the Philippines (1965–1986). The rule of Ferdinand Marcos and his wife Imelda has been called a "conjugal dictatorship" that stole up to an estimated $10 billion to finance the couple's extravagant lifestyle.
 Bongbong Marcos: Vice Governor of Ilocos Norte (1980–1983); Governor of Ilocos Norte (1983–1986); member of the Philippine House of Representatives from Ilocos Norte's Second District (1992–1995); Governor of Ilocos Norte (1998–2007); Senator of the Philippines (2010–2016); seventeenth president of the Philippines (2022-) 
Imelda Marcos (by affinity): Governor of Metropolitan Manila (1975–1986); Mambabatas Pambansa from Region IV-A (1978–1984); unsuccessful candidate for President in 1992; member of the Philippine House of Representatives from Leyte's First District (1995–1998); member of the Philippine House of Representatives from Ilocos Norte's Second District (2010–2016). She was convicted of 7 counts of graft and corruption by the Sandiganbayan anti-graft court on November 9, 2018. The word "Imeldific" was coined to describe her extravagance, greed, and frivolity.
Louise Araneta-Marcos: wife of Bongbong Marcos; First Lady of the Philippines (2022-)

Senators
 Imee Marcos: Assemblyman from Ilocos Norte (1984–1986); member of the Philippine House of Representatives from the second district of Ilocos Norte (1998–2007); governor of Ilocos Norte (2010–2019); member of the Philippine Senate (2019–present). A US court ruled in 1991 that Imee Marcos was liable for the death of student Archimedes Trajano.

House Representatives
 Mariano Marcos: Member of the Philippine House of Representatives from Ilocos Norte's Second District (1925—1931).
 Angelo Marcos Barba: Member of the Philippines House of Representatives from Ilocos Norte's Second District (2019–present).
 Ferdinand Alexander "Sandro" Marcos III: Member of the Philippines House of Representatives from Ilocos Norte's First District (2022–present).

Governors
 Elizabeth Marcos-Keon: Governor of Ilocos Norte (1971–1983)
 Michael Marcos Keon: Board Member of Ilocos Norte (2004–2007); Governor of Ilocos Norte (2007–2010); mayor of Laoag (2019–present)
 Matthew Marcos Manotoc: Senior Board Member, 2nd District of Ilocos Norte (2016–2019); Governor of Ilocos Norte (2019–present)

Other prominent members 

 Josefa Edralin Marcos (1893-1988): born Josefa Quetulio Edralin to Don Fructuoso Edralin y Carpio and Doña Emerenciana Quetulio y Taganas; was a school teacher and widow of Mariano and mother to Ferdinand; reputed to have served as chairperson of the board of more than a dozen companies during Ferdinand's 20-year presidency; left behind by the Marcoses at the Philippine Heart Center when they fled the country in February 1986; Died in 1988.
 Irene Marcos-Araneta: The third of the Marcos siblings and the last biological child of Ferdinand and Imelda Marcos.
 Aimee Marcos: The adopted daughter of Ferdinand and Imelda Marcos. Known as "Little Aimee", treated as the couple's bunso (lastborn); the only member of the Marcos family to still be a minor when Martial Law was formally lifted in 1981, and when the Marcoses were deposed in 1986; drummer for indie band "The Dorques."
Andres Avelino Marcos Barba: Son of Col. Marcelino Barba and Fortuna Edralin Marcos, sister of Ferdinand Marcos. Avelino Barba's bodyguard allegedly shot and killed 17-year old Apolinario Buendia while Avelino Barba allegedly shot Buendia's parents during a fight over a girls volleyball match in Makati City in July 1978.
Paolo Bediones: Paolo, only male child among four offspring, was born to Rodolfo Pineda Bediones (from Roxas City, Capiz) and Maria Teresa Barba who separated when Paolo was still young. His mother Maria is the daughter of Fortuna Marcos-Barba (Paolo's maternal grandmother) who's the sister of the late President Ferdinand Marcos (Paolo's maternal granduncle)
 Fernando Martin "Borgy" Marcos Manotoc: The son of Imee Marcos-Manotoc, a commercial model and entrepreneur.
 Analisa Josefa Hegyesi Corr: The Australian-raised daughter of Ferdinand Marcos and former Sydney model, Evelin Hegyesi. Her second given name was taken after her grandmother, Ferdinand's mother, Josefa Edralin. Analisa is an accomplished interior designer; completing projects in London, Singapore, Sydney and Port Douglas, a commercial photographer, a successful residential property developer and dedicated equestrian; having competed in eventing, namely dressage and showjumping, around Australia and in England.

See also 
 Political dynasties in the Philippines
 List of political families in the Philippines
 Julio Nalundasan
 Implementation of Martial law under Ferdinand Marcos
 Philippine Constitutional Convention of 1971
 Archimedes Trajano
 1987 Constitution of the Philippines
 Cacique democracy
 Martin Romualdez

References 

 
Political families of the Philippines
Ilocos Norte
Ferdinand Marcos
Imelda Marcos